Chernikov (masculine) or Chernikova (feminine) is a Russian surname. Notable people with the surname include:

Aleksandr Chernikov (disambiguation), multiple people
Alexander Chernikov (born 1984), Russian ice hockey player
Sergei Nikolaevich Chernikov (1912-1987), Russian mathematician
Valentin Chernikov (1937–2002), Soviet fencer
Yakov Chernikhov, Soviet architect

Russian-language surnames